Joy Richard Mpinga Mukena (born 3 July 1999) is an English professional footballer who plays as a defender for St Albans City.

Career
Mukena began his career with Tottenham Hotspur, but moved to Watford in 2017, where he turned professional. He was named on the bench for the senior team's 4–1 win over Chelsea on 5 February 2018, but was ultimately an unused sub.

On 21 August 2020, Mukena signed for National League South side St Albans City.

Personal life
Mukena was born in England, and is also eligible to represent DR Congo Belgium at international level. Mukena was called to a DR Congo U20 football camp in March 2018.

References

1999 births
Living people
Footballers from Greater London
English footballers
English sportspeople of Democratic Republic of the Congo descent
Watford F.C. players
Bracknell Town F.C. players
St Albans City F.C. players
Association football defenders
Black British sportspeople